The 2009 UK & Ireland Greyhound Racing Year was the 84th year of greyhound racing in the United Kingdom and Ireland.

Roll of honour

Summary
The British Greyhound Racing Board and the National Greyhound Racing Club merged to form a new organisation called the Greyhound Board of Great Britain (G.B.G.B). The remit was the same in regard to rules and regulations and the promotion of the sport but there were significant changes in regard to the welfare of the greyhounds. One of the new rules brought in was the requirement for every greyhound to be microchipped and drug tested before it was even allowed to set foot on any track for a qualifying trial. The merger allowed the governing body to track every greyhound registered to race on licensed tracks and would help combat the small minority that abused welfare rules. The new Chief Executive of the G.B.G.B would be former Olympic field hockey gold medallist Ian Taylor, well known as the goalkeeper in the famous 1988 Seoul Games. He would only stay in the position for a relatively short time however and saw the bookmakers levy decreasing; it dropped £2 million to £10 million in total, a very worrying statistic.

The industry in Ireland hit a brick wall with the Sports Minister Martin Cullen announcing a 13% funding reduction on Irish racing. Paddy Power subsequently announced they are withdrawing their Derby sponsorship. Attendances were down 12% and tote betting down 8%.

The two leading prizes of the English Greyhound Derby and Irish Greyhound Derby went to Kinda Ready and College Causeway respectively.

Fear Zafonic went on to win the greyhound of the year after securing the East Anglian Derby and Mark Wallis topped off a superb year with the most open races points and the trainers title for the third time.

Tracks
Two tracks closed; on 17 June it was announced that the Boulevard in Hull would close to greyhound racing once again after less than two years trading. After going to once a week racing, promoter Dave Marshall pulled the plug on funding for the stadium and the last meeting was on 27 June.

Coventry closed after Boxing Day with the company going into liquidation. It closed on a sour note with the Racing Manager Russ Watkin fined £5,000 for allowing 67 races to go off before their official race time.

Ballyskeagh in Lisburn, County Antrim, Northern Ireland reopened under a new name and would be known as Drumbo Park. It is known as the New Grosvenor Stadium during the daytime football matches and then changes to Drumbo Park for the Greyhounds in the evening.

Competitions
The GRA made more cuts including trimming their major race fixtures. The last Gold Collar and Gorton Cup were held at Belle Vue Stadium. The Scurry Gold Cup had been switched from Perry Barr Stadium earlier in the year to Belle Vue.

The Scottish Greyhound Derby featured five Irish hounds in the final and the event was won by Cabra Cool. On the same night as the final Greenwell River set a new track record of 28.66 in the invitation race.

News
Geoff De Mulder, one of the all-time great trainers, died aged 79. The 'Wizard of Meriden' who had been ill for some time sent out two English Greyhound Derby winners, a Scottish Greyhound Derby, the Welsh Greyhound Derby and four consolation Derby events. He sent out 14 Derby finalists and won a whole host of other major races.

Track bookmaker Tony Morris stood for the last time at Wimbledon and top greyhounds Lenson Joker, Horseshoe Ping and Flying Winner were all retired, the latter had broken eight track records.

Principal UK finals

Principal Irish finals

References 

Greyhound racing in the United Kingdom
Greyhound racing in the Republic of Ireland
2009 in British sport
2009 in Irish sport